Ignacio Zamudio Cruz (born 15 May 1971) is a Mexican race walker.

Personal bests
20 km: 1:22:06 hrs –  Eisenhüttenstadt, 8 May 1999 
50 km: 3:46:07 hrs –  Atlanta, Georgia, 2 August 1996

Achievements

*: Started as a guest out of competition.

External links
 

Tilastopaja biography
 Picture of Ignacio Zamudio: Robert Korzienowski of Poland leading Daniel Garcia (MEX) Valentin Massana (ESP), Ignacio Zamudio (MEX) and German Sanchez (MEX).

References

1971 births
Living people
Mexican male racewalkers
Athletes (track and field) at the 1996 Summer Olympics
Olympic athletes of Mexico
Central American and Caribbean Games gold medalists for Mexico
Competitors at the 1998 Central American and Caribbean Games
Central American and Caribbean Games medalists in athletics
20th-century Mexican people